"Personal" is a song performed by English singer Hrvy. The song was released as a digital download on 30 November 2017, by Universal Music as the third and final single from his second extended play Talk to Ya. The song peaked at number sixty-two on the UK Singles Chart. The song was written by Blair Dreelan, Danny Shah, Harvey Cantwell, Jordan Thomas and Justus Nzeribe.

Music video
A music video to accompany the release of "Personal" was released onto YouTube on 30 November 2017. Loren Gray, Ariel Martin, and Luna Blaise appear in the video. It has since reached over 300 million views as of October 2022.

Track listing

Personnel
Credits adapted from Tidal. 
 Sky Adams – Producer, associated performer, background vocalist, bass (vocal), clapping, guitar, keyboards, mixer, programming, studio personnel
 Blair Dreelan – Composer, lyricist
 Danny Shah – Composer, lyricist, associated performer, background vocalist, clapping, guitar
 Harvey Cantwell – Composer, lyricist, associated performer, vocals
 Jordan Thomas – Composer, lyricist
 Justus Nzeribe – Composer, lyricist
 Dick Beetham – Mastering Engineer, studio personnel

Charts

Certifications

Release history

References

2017 songs
2017 singles
Hrvy songs